Zach Sproule (born 12 May 1998) is an Australian rules footballer who plays for the Greater Western Sydney in the Australian Football League (AFL). He joined the club as a Category B rookie selections coming from the Giant's Academy. He made his senior debut against Western Bulldogs in round 22 of the 2019 season. Zach signed with the South Adelaide Football Club in the SANFL for the 2023 season.

References

External links

Greater Western Sydney Giants players
Australian rules footballers from New South Wales
Murray Bushrangers players
1998 births
Living people